The 1962 Drake Bulldogs football team was an American football team that represented Drake University as an independent during the 1962 NCAA College Division football season. In its third season under head coach Bus Mertes, the team compiled a 8–2 record and outscored all opponents by a total of 204 to 108. The team played its home games at Drake Stadium in Des Moines, Iowa.

Schedule

References

Drake
Drake Bulldogs football seasons
Drake Bulldogs football